The 2017–18 Handbollsligan was the 84th season of the top division of Swedish handball. 14 teams competed in the league. The eight highest placed teams qualified for the playoffs, whereas teams 11–13 had to play relegation playoffs against teams from the second division, and team 14 was relegated automatically. IFK Kristianstad won the regular season and also won the playoffs to claim their eighth Swedish title.

League table

Playoffs bracket

An asterisk (*) denotes result after extra time

Attendance

References 

Swedish handball competitions